Enseosteus is an extinct genus of small selenosteid arthrodire placoderms known from the Upper Frasnian Kellwasserkalk facies of Late Devonian Germany and Morocco.

Enseosteus is very similar to the other Kellwasserkalk selenosteids, though, the type species, E. jaekelli, has a bulbous, knob-shaped rostrum.  Denison (1978) synonymizes the genera Ottonosteus (O. jaekeli = E. hermanni) and Walterosteus with Enseosteus, claiming that the two genera are too similar to Enseosteus to merit separate genus status.  Rücklin (2011) agrees with Denison's synonymizing of Ottonosteus, but rejects Denison's synonymization of Walterosteus, claiming how Walterosteus has a contact between the rostral plate and the pineal plate, which Enseosteus does not.

References

Selenosteidae
Placoderms of Europe
Placoderms of Africa